Hawa is a 2022 Bangladeshi mystery-drama film written and directed by Mejbaur Rahman Sumon. The film was produced by Sun Music and Motion Pictures Limited. The film stars Chanchal Chowdhury, Nazifa Tushi, Sariful Razz, Sumon Anowar, Shohel Mondol, Nasir Uddin Khan and Rizvi Rizu among others.

The film was released on 29 July 2022 in 24 cinemas and received positive reviews. From Bangladesh Hawa has been sent for nomination into the 'Best International Feature Film' category of the 95th Academy Awards, by the Oscar Committee Bangladesh. It was shortlisted for 80th Golden Globe Awards.

Synopsis 
The film depicts the journey of an all-men team on a fishing trawler, eventually where the mystery of life and relationships gets re-interpreted. The usual fishing mission of a group of seasoned boatmen of Cox's Bazar finds an unheard-of catch in the deep of the sea. They caught a beautiful yet mysterious young girl and then enter the world of men on the boat. The story of the film is based on a fairy tale.

Cast

Production 
Principal photography of the film started on October 13, 2019. The film was shot on St. Martin's Island in the Bay of Bengal. It was shot by Monpura cinematographer SA Kamrul Hasan Khasru.

Music

Release

Theatrical
The film was theatrically released on 29 July 2022 in Bangladesh. It received positive reviews from critics, with praise for its story and Chanchal Chowdhury's performance. It was released in Australia and New Zealand on 13 August 2022 and in the United States and Canada on 2 September 2022. It was shown for more than 100 days in the Bangladeshi movie theatres. It released in West Bengal on the scheduled day in 34 cinemas. It was released in Delhi, Haryana, Maharashtra and Uttar Pradesh on 6 January 2023.

Distribution
On 7 December 2022, Reliance Entertainment announced that they and CEPL had become the distributors of Hawa and the film will be released on 16 December in West Bengal and 30 December across India.

Screening
In late October, Hawa was screened in Nandan, Kolkata on the occasion of the 4th Bangladesh film festival. It was invited to the 28th Kolkata International Film Festival in 'Special Screening' section and was screened on 16 December 2022.

Home media
Hawa was digitally premiered on iScreen from 16 March 2023.

Controversies 
After the release of the film, some on social media claimed that the film was a remake of Sea Fog, but its director denied it, saying that the subject of Sea Fog is human trafficking and his film's story has nothing to do with it. Chanchal Chowdhury claims it is an original story film while some call it a plagiarized version of Abhijan film directed by Razzak.

The film was also accused of violating the Wildlife Protection Act 2012, where Chanchal Chowdhury was seen eating the meat of an acridotheres. The director denied the claim but the wildlife crime unit registered a case against him on August 17. After 11 days, the wildlife crime unit applied the court to withdraw the case and expressed their desire to fix the issue by discuss with the production team. Nargis Sultana, the plaintiff in the case, was arraigned by the Ministry of Information and Broadcasting on August 29 for filing the case.

A legal notice was issued on 22 August 2022 to stop and ban the screening of the film citing violation of wildlife conservation laws, use of obscene language and violent murder scenes. On 29 October 2022, another case was made against producer and Chanchal Chowdhury for not showing anti-smoking warning in the film.

Reception

Critical response 
Hasib Ur Rashid Ifti, a columnist for The Daily Star praised its cinematography and color grading. He also praised the acting of Chanchal and Nasir. Saykot Kabir Shayok from The Business Standard praised its dialogue and background music and said: "Hawa is reportedly houseful across the country on the first day and I would say it is truly worth the hype." According to columnist Ahsan Kabir, it is the most talked film of Cinema of Bangladesh in 2022. According to him, the song "Tumi Bondhu Kala Pakhi" from this film takes people to another world and he appreciated the song. According to Tanmoy Pal of Ajker Patrika, the best part of this film is its actors. He felt the film's dialogues were uninteresting and the character named Gulati lacked variety. According to Indradatta Basu of Anandabazar Patrika, Hawa, the film made with care, highlighted the plight of a woman in a male-dominated society and critiqued patriarchy politically. According to her, the story would have been able to reveal its multi-dimensionality if the character of Gulti had been silent throughout. According to Basu, as a thriller film, it failed to create a thrill. Alam Khorshed of Bangla Tribune appreciated the director's political and social relevance of the country's folk mythology in the film. According to him the film has a touch of excellence in every aspect.

Response from India 
After the film was released in Nandan, Kolkata on the occasion of the 4th Bangladesh Film Festival, audiences there flocked to see it, a rarity in the city in the past few decades. There it was decided to screen the film in four shows. But two more shows were extended due to the interest of the residents to watch the film. Indian film director Raj Chakraborty praised the acting, cinematography and direction of Hawa. Those who were unable to watch the film in Kolkata demanded that it be released in movie theatres in West Bengal.

Box office 
Hawa grossed   in the United States and Canada till 6 September 2022, making it 27th film in the US Top Chart. It earned  in first week of its release from West Bengal.

Accolades

See also
 List of submissions to the 95th Academy Awards for Best International Feature Film
 List of Bangladeshi submissions for the Academy Award for Best International Feature Film

References

External links
 
 

2022 films
2022 drama films
2022 directorial debut films
2020s Bengali-language films
Bengali-language Bangladeshi films
Bangladeshi mystery drama films
Films shot in Chittagong Division
Bangladeshi films about revenge
Works subject to a lawsuit
Animal cruelty incidents in film
Films involved in plagiarism controversies
Film controversies in Bangladesh
Films postponed due to the COVID-19 pandemic